Kerala Startup Mission (KSUM, formerly known as Technopark TBI) is the central agency of the Government of Kerala for entrepreneurship development and incubation activities in Kerala, India. KSUM was primarily founded to undertake the planning, establishment, and management of the technology business incubator (TBI), a startup accelerator in Kerala, to promote technology-based entrepreneurship activities, and to create the infrastructure and environment required to support high-technology-based businesses.

Additional goals of KSUM include:

 coordinating the functions of other incubators in the state
 strengthening the entrepreneurship development activities of the state government
 promoting knowledge-driven and technology-based startup ventures by students, faculties, and local entrepreneurs
 planning and implementing linkages with industry and networking activities
 setting up Research and Development facilities
 encouraging the formation of Innovation and Entrepreneurship Development Cells (IEDCs) and technoparks in academic institutions, and capacity building programmes for human resources.

Incubation programme 
KSUM supports entrepreneurs in developing technology-based business ventures, for example startups with high-technology products. A startup's early development can usually be divided into three stages, pre-incubation (3–6 months), incubation (6–12 months) and an accelerator stage (3–6 months).

The pre-incubation stage mainly focuses on ideation of a potentially innovative idea.

During the incubation stage, startup companies begin product development and prepare themselves for marketing. KSUM provides the startups with modular space, any applicable grants or funding, and mentorship. They also provide services such as entrepreneur training and workshops.

In the accelerator stage KSUM offers a business tool box and a business advisory service, resembling traditional management consulting or mentoring. KSUM will assist the startup in presentations to venture capitalists and investors.

KSUM - EY Accelerator 
KSUM has collaborated with Ernst & Young to develop a Business & Technology Accelerator providing fully equipped and functional office space of 1500 sq.ft at the KINFRA Film & Video Park, Thiruvananthapuram. The objective is to offer technology and business leadership and mentorship support for selected start-ups incubated in the state of Kerala. Start-ups are offered a six-month acceleration programme (extendable to 12 months) to increase the business sophistication and skills of selected entrepreneurs. The programme encompasses mentorship support in all areas of business and technology including business strategy, finance, human resources, investment proposals, emerging technology trends, and market research. The accelerator programme will also support entrepreneurs to network with industry captains, angel investors, venture capitalists and so on.

Knowledge Labs 
KSUM democratizes the access to the rapid prototyping technology via Fablab and to necessary equipment for the research & development of emerging technologies via AI lab, XR lab and Design Lab which help the startups to turn ideas into functioning prototypes.

Fab Lab 
With the support of the Government of Kerala, KSUM has started two MIT (Massachusetts Institute of Technology) USA Electronics Fabrication Laboratories, commonly called Fab Labs, at the Technopark, Trivandrum and the Kerala Technology Innovation Zone (KTIZ), Kochi. The location in Technopark, Trivandrum is inside the Indian Institute of Information Technology and Management, Kerala (IIITM-K). A Fab Lab is a technical prototyping platform for innovation and invention which aims to provide a stimulus for local entrepreneurship and serves as a platform for learning and innovation. It is a small scale workshop offering digital fabrication that empowers the users to create smart devices which can be tailored to local or personal needs.

The Fab Lab is also a way for local entrepreneurs to connect to a global community of learners, educators, technologists, researchers and innovators. The entrepreneur thus becomes part of a self-sustaining global knowledge-sharing network. The Fab Lab programme aims to encourage startups in printed electronics and other such fields in Kerala. This project is a collaboration between KSUM and the Center for Bits and Atoms Fab Lab Foundation at the Massachusetts Institute of Technology.

Super Fab Lab 
In 2020, India's first Super Fab Lab was inaugurated in Kochi, Kerala. The lab is built in collaboration with Massachusetts Institute of Technology(MIT) and is spread across an area of 10,000 sq ft. The Super Fab Lab has state-of-the-art machines worth more than ₹7 crore, enabling researchers, innovators and developers to go beyond the scope of existing fab labs in the state. This Super Fab Lab located at the Integrated Startup Complex(ISC) is the only such facility outside of the US.

Other Programmes

Learn To Code (Raspberry Pi Program) 
The Kerala government launched the initiative "Learn to Code" in 2015. During phase 1 of the initiative, 2500 Raspberry Pi computer programming kits were distributed to class VIII students (14 years old). The project's aim is to add 40,000 talented young programmers to the maker community being developed through programmes initiated by KSUM.  Subsequently, KSUM and the IT@School Project initiated the Kerala Raspberry Pi Competition for students who received the Raspberry Pi kit.

Startup Box 
In 2015, the Kerala government introduced the 'Startup Box Programme' for aspiring entrepreneurs through KSUM. The Startup Box consists of documents required to start a company, plus key technologies including an arduino starter kit. The Startup Box Programme will be given to up to 50 teams composed of college students annually.

See also 
 Economy of Kerala
 Unemployment in Kerala

References

External links 
 

2006 establishments in Kerala
Business incubators of India
Economy of Kerala
Organisations based in Thiruvananthapuram